Candy Devine, MBE (born ca. 1939) is the stage name of Faye Ann McLeod  (born Faye Ann Guivarra), an Australian-born broadcaster, singer, and actress. She was a radio broadcaster and singer in Northern Ireland for over 35 years.

Early years 

Candy Devine (birth name Faye Ann Guivarra) was born in about 1939 in Cairns to a sugar-farming family. Devine has a multicultural heritage, with 
Sri Lankan, Filipino, Spanish, Danish and Torres Strait Islander backgrounds. Her parents were co-founders of the Cairns multicultural music group, the Tropical Troubadours, and later established the city's Coloured Social Club.

Devine was educated at St Augustine's School, East Innisfail, a boarding school from 1948 – she provided "incidental music and accompaniments" at their 1952 break-up ceremony. For secondary education she attended Brisbane's Lourdes Hill College from the early 1950s. She furthered her interest in music while at college. Later she studied piano and cello at Queensland Conservatorium before taking to the stage in Sydney.

Devine's appearances in Australian television include the series Skippy the Bush Kangaroo (1968) and fronting for ABC's, In Key.

Life in Ireland 

Devine travelled to Ireland in 1969 on what was intended to be a short visit. She was hired for a cabaret slot at the Talk of the Town club in Belfast. She married her promoter and booking agent, Donald McLeod, in Dublin in 1970. They lived in the Republic for five years and moved to Belfast in Northern Ireland in 1975.

Devine began a long career with Downtown Radio in March 1976. They had four children, including Brisbane-based celebrity chef, Alastair McLeod. Candy Devine was awarded an MBE on The Queen's 2014 honours list. Her award was for "Services to Broadcasting and to the Community in Northern Ireland".

She moved back to Australia in 2013 following the death of her husband, Donald McLeod, the previous year. As of September 2016 she lives in Brisbane, sharing a five-acre property with her son, Alastair and his family.

References

1930s births
Year of birth uncertain
Living people
Australian television actresses
Australian women singers
Australian people of Danish descent
Australian people of Scottish descent
Australian people of Spanish descent
Australian people of Filipino descent
Australian radio presenters
Australian women radio presenters
Radio personalities from Northern Ireland
Australian people of Sri Lankan descent
People from Innisfail, Queensland
Queensland Conservatorium Griffith University alumni
People educated at Lourdes Hill College
Australian expatriates in the United Kingdom